Bellicidia incompta is a species of fungus belonging to the family Ramalinaceae.

Its scientific citation is: (Borrer) Kistenich, Timdal, Bendiksby & S.Ekman, 2018.

It has cosmopolitan distribution.

Synonyms:
 Bacidia incompta

References

Fungi